The 2012 PBA D-League Foundation Cup is the second conference of the 2011-12 PBA D-League season. It is composed of 10 teams including the debut of Erase Plantcenta Erasers and Cagayan Rising Suns and the readmission of Junior Powerade Tigers as Freego Jeans Makers, PC Gilmore Wizards, Cobra Energy Drink Iron Men and Dub Unlimited Wheelers are disbanded.

Eliminations

Standings
The table below shows the standings of each team at the end of elimination round:

Bracket

PBA D-League Foundation Cup
2011–12 in Philippine basketball